Arne Sakari Somersalo (born 18 March 1891 in Tampere as Arne Sommer – died 17 August 1941 near Kiestinki, Soviet Union) was a Finnish officer and anti-communist activist.

Somersalo was educated at the University of Helsinki before studying natural sciences at the University of Jena. Based in Germany during the First World War he enrolled in the German Army as an officer in 1916, serving until the armistice. He would later claim that the war had been the death of old Europe and argued that one of its main positives was that it had "rescued our nation from the deadly, slimy embrace of a lothsome cuttlefish" in reference to Russia. He transferred straight to the Finnish Army and from 1920 to 1926 was the commander of the Finnish Air Force.

He became involved in politics in 1926 when he started editing the right wing journal Valkoinen Vartio and then founded the fiercely anti-communist Finnish Defence League. He joined the Lapua Movement in 1930 then the Patriotic People's Movement (IKL) in 1932, serving as a delegate to the Parliament of Finland for the latter from 1933 to 1935 for Turku. He was also the editor-in-chief of the IKL party newspaper Ajan Suunta from 1931 to 1935. Ideologically he was a supporter of corporatism and was close to fascism.

Recalled to active service for the Winter War, he acted as Chief of Staff for the frontline in Suomussalmi and was awarded the Order of the Cross of Liberty for his actions. During the Continuation War, Somersalo acted as a liaison officer for the German SS division Nord in Finnish Lapland. He was killed in action near Kiestinki (Kestenga), USSR on 17 August 1941.

References

1891 births
1941 deaths
People from Tampere
People from Häme Province (Grand Duchy of Finland)
Patriotic People's Movement (Finland) politicians
Members of the Parliament of Finland (1933–36)
Finnish Air Force personnel
Finnish military personnel killed in World War II
University of Jena alumni
Finnish soldiers
Recipients of the Order of the Cross of Liberty
Recipients of the Iron Cross (1914), 1st class
Finnish fascists